The Lebanon men's national basketball team, controlled by the Lebanese Basketball Federation (FLB), has represented Lebanon in basketball since its inception in 1947. The squad is governed by FIBA, and is part of the FIBA Asia zone.

Lebanon is considered one of the top teams in Asia, finishing runners-up in the FIBA Asia Cup four times (in 2001, 2005, 2007 and 2022). The team has also participated in the FIBA World Championship three times (2002, 2006 and 2010), failing to qualify past the preliminary round on all three occasions.

In 2013, Lebanon was banned by FIBA in all sanctioned events after political interventions in Lebanese basketball. Therefore, Lebanon didn't participate in the 2013 FIBA Asia Championship, missing the chance to qualify to the 2014 FIBA Basketball World Cup for the fourth time in a row. The ban was then removed in early 2014 after the election of a new basketball federation.

History

Early history 
The first time basketball was played in Lebanon was in the mid-1920s in the American University of Beirut. The Lebanese Basketball Federation was jointly founded later in 1949 along with the Lebanese Volleyball Federation.

The refusal of the Soviet Union to host Eurobasket 1949 and FIBA Europe's unwillingness to ask Czechoslovakia to host consecutive tournaments meant that 1947 bronze medallist Egypt hosted the competition. Due to travel difficulties and fears, few European teams would travel to the African country to compete. Lebanon, as well as Syria, were asked to compete in the European championship despite being Asian countries. Lebanon made their debut in the European championship tournaments. They lost all six of their games in the seven-team round-robin tournament, finishing in seventh and last place.

Lebanon played in the European competition again at Eurobasket 1953 in Moscow. They lost all four of their preliminary round, including one by forfeit as the team refused to play against Israel. The team was able to defeat Sweden in the first classification round, giving them their first Eurobasket win. They placed fourth in their five-team group, advancing to the 13–16 classification games. They lost the first 58–56 to West Germany, but won against Denmark 74–40 to take 15th place of the 17 teams.

2000s: Four-time Asian runners-up and World Cup qualifications
Lebanon finished in second place at the 2001 ABC Championship and qualified to the 2002 FIBA World Championship, where they lost in the first round.

At the 2005 FIBA Asia Championship, Lebanon reached the final for the second time and qualified to the 2006 FIBA World Championship. Despite winning 82–72 against Venezuela and 74–73 against France, Lebanon fell short of qualifying to the round of 16.

Lebanon finished runners-up for the third time at the 2007 FIBA Asia Championship, losing to Iran 74–69 in the final. That loss prevented Lebanon from qualifying to the 2008 Summer Olympics.

At the 2009 FIBA Asia Championship, Lebanon reached the semi-finals but losses to China and Jordan prevented the team from qualifying outright to the World Championship in 2010. Fortunately, Lebanon were granted that year a wildcard spot to its third straight World Cup appearance. A single win 81–71 against Canada wasn't enough for Lebanon to advance past the group stage at 2010 FIBA World Championship.

2013 FIBA suspension and ramifications

From July 2013, Lebanon served a FIBA-approved indefinite suspension. This came after the parties within the country's national basketball federation failed to resolve their differences, forcing FIBA Asia to suspend the country from all of its sanctioned events until further notice in spite of the fact that FIBA Asia secretary general Hagop Khatcherian is Lebanese. However, on 8 May 2014 after recent appeals by the Lebanese Federation, FIBA eventually uplifted the ban allowing the national team to once again compete on the international stage.

The 2013 FIBA Asia Championship was the intercontinental championship for basketball organized by FIBA Asia that served as the qualifying tournament for the 2014 FIBA Basketball World Cup in Spain. The tournament was held from 1–11 August in Metro Manila, Philippines. Beirut, Lebanon was supposed to host the tournament but the hosting rights was given to the Philippines citing the Syrian Civil War and security concerns in the Middle East in general. This is also the last Asian Championships that will serve as the qualifying round for the FIBA Basketball World Cup, as a two-year cycle competition systems will be used starting with 2019 World Cup qualification.

Lebanon originally qualified for the tournament after placing second in the 2013 West Asian Basketball Championship. However, after the country's basketball federation was suspended indefinitely by FIBA due to unresolved conflicts within the country's national basketball federation, they were replaced by fourth-placer Iraq. But Iraq declined due to lack of preparation, and FIBA Asia instead tapped the United Arab Emirates to replace them. However, the United Arab Emirates also declined the invitation for the same reason, and after FIBA's confirmation of the Lebanese federation's suspension, FIBA Asia decided not to take in any more replacements, reducing the total number of teams to 15. This left Group B with only three teams, and some games were moved from the Ninoy Aquino Stadium to compensate for the lost games involving Lebanon. All Group B teams thus automatically qualify for the second round, regardless of the outcome of their first round matches.

2020s: Recent history

In over a decade, Lebanon were able once again to reach the finals and finish in second place at the 2022 FIBA Asia Cup after a 73–75 loss against Australia. That same year, Lebanon qualified for the 2023 FIBA Basketball World Cup.

Competitive record

FIBA World Cup

EuroBasket

FIBA Asia Cup

Team

Current roster
Roster for the third window of 2023 FIBA World Cup qualifiers against Jordan and Saudi Arabia:

See also
Sport in Lebanon
Lebanon men's national under-19 basketball team
Lebanon men's national under-17 basketball team
Lebanon women's national basketball team
Lebanon women's national under-17 basketball team

References

External links

 
 FIBA profile

National, mens
Men's national basketball teams
Basketball